Amazon Marketplace is an e-commerce platform owned and operated by Amazon that enables third-party sellers to sell new or used products on a fixed-price online marketplace alongside Amazon's regular offerings. Using Amazon Marketplace, third-party sellers gain access to Amazon's customer base, and Amazon expands the offerings on its site without having to invest in additional inventory.

Overview
Items purchased on Amazon from third-party sellers are either fulfilled by the merchant (FBM) or fulfilled by Amazon (FBA). FBM goods are kept in the third-party seller's inventory, and shipping and customer service are handled by the third-party merchant. FBA goods are stored in Amazon's fulfillment centers, and shipping and customer service are handled by Amazon.

Amazon charges its third-party merchants a referral fee for each sale which is a percentage of the sales price. Additionally, sellers using FBA must pay additional fees which include a pick, pack and weight charge.

, third-party sales on Amazon accounted for 54% of paid units. In 2016, more than 10,000 third-party sellers generated more than $1 billion of annual sales. Over 1,000,000 third-party sellers joined in 2017. The growing success of these Amazon sellers has garnered the attention of some of the largest e-commerce roll-up businesses – known as Amazon Aggregators. These aggregators operate a buy-and-build model, deploying capital to acquire attractive brands and leverage in-house operational expertise to increase growth and maximize margin. A variety of strategies are used to achieve this, including listing optimization, spending on marketing & advertising, inventory & supply chain management, and expansion geographically or into other direct-to-consumer channels. As of October 2021, there are 79 aggregators with $10.9bn in disclosed funding.

There are three major paths third-party sellers can take on Amazon. Wholesale, private label and retail arbitrage.

If an Amazon Seller has an active registered trademark for their brand that appears on their products or packaging and can verify themselves as the rights owner or the authorized agent for the trademark, they can apply for Amazon Brand Registry.

Amazon has an internal search algorithm (A9) that works almost in the same way as those of Google or Bing. The algorithm analyzes search queries that users enter in a search bar and selects the most relevant offers from brands with a good track record.

Locations

As of March 2021, Amazon Marketplace operates worldwide in 19 countries; chronologically:

United States
Canada
Mexico
United Kingdom
Germany
France
Italy
Spain
Japan
Singapore
Turkey
Brazil
Australia
India
United Arab Emirates
Saudi Arabia
Netherlands
Sweden
Poland

Additionally, Amazon maintains limited operations in China.

Suspension

Amazon takes a zero-tolerance stance on what it calls seller performance. Amazon suspends seller accounts, sometimes indefinitely.

Suspended sellers are prohibited from opening a new seller account.

Suspension reasons

 Seller Performance: This is where Amazon deems a seller to be performing under its required standards.
 Product Performance: This covers products that may have been reported to Amazon for quality issues.
 Delivery Performance: This covers both dispatch and delivery timescales.
 Counterfeit Reporting: If a product is reported as a counterfeit, Amazon removes selling privileges until further inquiry is completed.

Non-suspension restrictions

Sometimes Amazon may restrict certain sellers items or ability to sell without suspending the whole account.

 Staging Status: This is where a seller is newly launched and or Amazon wants to temporarily restrict the seller's ability to sell items without suspending the account. Sellers often report their account appearing to be in vacation mode and unable to re-activate their listings.
 ASIN Creation Privileges: Sellers are able to create new items for sale on Amazon without any supervision. Any seller found to be abusing this functionality has what Amazon considers the privilege removed.

Criticism

Amazon's dispute resolution policies and practices for Marketplace have drawn criticism from many sellers. The Verge has reported that many fear a complaint lodged against them with Amazon more than they would an actual lawsuit. Among their specific complaints are that policies are vague and contradictory, that buyers are often taken at their word and thus businesses are forced to admit and correct wrongdoing for perceived or minimal shortcomings rather than contest the complaint since there is no other way to get reinstated. Rules meant to protect sellers have also been weaponized, with many merchants devoting their energies to getting competitors suspended or removed from the site entirely.

On July 3, 2019, the 3rd U.S. Circuit Court of Appeals ruled against Amazon.com Inc., stating that the online retailer can be held liable under state law for third-party sales on its portal.  After granting Amazon's petition for rehearing en banc, in a decision issued on June 2, 2020, the 3rd Circuit subsequently vacated the prior order and certified to the Pennsylvania Supreme Court the question of whether, under Pennsylvania law, an e-commerce business like Amazon is strictly liable for a defective product that was purchased on its platform from a third-party vendor, which product was neither possessed nor owned by the e-commerce business.  The Pennsylvania Supreme Court accepted the question for consideration; however, the case settled via stipulated dismissal between the parties and was discontinued by the court before such hearing could occur.

See also
 Amazon tax — Information about paying sales tax as a seller or as a buyer
 Amazon.com controversies — Includes information on the misuse of Marketplace facilities

References

External links

Marketplace
Online marketplaces of the United States